Ponometia altera is a moth of the family Noctuidae. It is found in the southern parts of the United States, including New Mexico, Arizona and California.

The wingspan is about 21 mm.

The larvae feed on Ericameria species.

External links
Images
Bug Guide

Acontiinae
Moths described in 1903